Rozan is a surname. Notable people with the surname include:

Michel Rozan, French wrestler
Micheline Rozan (1928–2018), French producer 
S. J. Rozan (born 1950), American architect and writer 
Varel Rozan (born 1992), Congolese footballer

See also
 
DeMar DeRozan (born 1989), American basketball player